Joseph Albert List (born April 6, 1982) is an American comedian and actor.

Early life
Joseph Albert List was born in Whitman, Massachusetts, on April 6, 1982. He began performing stand-up comedy in Boston, Massachusetts in 2000, shortly after graduating from high school.

Career
List has released two stand-up comedy albums, So Far No Good (2013) and Are You Mad at Me? (2016). He has been featured on Conan and The Late Show with David Letterman. In 2015, he was a finalist on NBC's Last Comic Standing and recorded a half-hour comedy special on Comedy Central.

List has been a co-host of the weekly podcast Tuesdays with Stories alongside fellow comedian Mark Normand since 2013. More recently, he has also hosted the Mindful Metal Jacket podcast and the Joe and Raanan Talk Movies podcast with comedian Raanan Hershberg. He is also a regular on Robert Kelly's podcast You Know What Dude. In 2016, he toured the U.S. and Europe while opening for Louis C.K., which included three performances at Madison Square Garden. He is a regular at the Comedy Cellar in New York City.

List released a special for Netflix's The Standups in 2018. His next special, I Hate Myself, was self-produced and premiered on Comedy Central's YouTube channel in August 2020.

In 2022, he co-wrote (with Louis C.K.) and starred in Fourth of July, a comedy-drama film directed and produced by Louis C.K.

Personal life
List is a recovering alcoholic and has been sober since 2012.

In 2017, List married Sarah Tollemache, a fellow comedian from Kingwood, Texas. They battled against each other on an episode of Jeff Ross Presents Roast Battle.

Discography
 So Far No Good (2013)
 Are You Mad At Me? (2016)
 I Hate Myself (2020)
 This Year's Material (2022)

Filmography
 Fourth of July (2022)

References

1982 births
Living people
American stand-up comedians
Place of birth missing (living people)
21st-century American comedians
Comedians from Massachusetts
People from Whitman, Massachusetts